Copenhagen Historic Grand Prix is a vintage motor sports car race held annually on the grounds of Bellahøj in Copenhagen, Denmark. It has been arranged since 2001 (at Fælledparken from 2001 to 2012) and takes place in the first weekend of August. Prince Joachim of Denmark is a regular participator along with numerous Danish and International professional racing drivers.

Cars compete separately in various classes, including a large number of vehicles in the pre-World War II class. Around 200 vintage cars participate, such as Bentley's from the 1920s, Bugatti's from the 1930s, Jaguar's and Porsche's from the 1950s and Lotus Cortina's, Alfa Romeo's and Jaguar E's from the 1960s.

The Royal Pro-Am Class is the class where Prince Joachim and other amateurs share their cars with professional drivers. In 2008, 25 Le Mans drivers attended the race, including the eight time Le Mans winner Tom Kristensen.

Apart from the multiple races, various other demonstrations, presentations and car shows take place as well as the marking of historic car models.

The only non-historic car to participate in the event was the Zenvo ST1.

Lap records 

The official race lap records at the Bellahøj Park Copenhagen Historic Grand Prix Circuit are listed as:

References

External links
 Copenhagen Historic Grand Prix official web site

Sports car races
Historic motorsport events
Motorsport venues in Denmark
Annual events in Denmark